The GL postcode area, also known as the Gloucester postcode area, is a group of 27 postcode districts covering 28 post towns: Badminton, Berkeley, Blakeney, Cheltenham, Chipping Campden, Cinderford, Cirencester, Coleford, Drybrook, Dursley, Dymock, Fairford, Gloucester, Lechlade, Longhope, Lydbrook, Lydney, Mitcheldean, Moreton-in-Marsh, Newent, Newnham, Ruardean, Stonehouse, Stroud, Tetbury, Tewkesbury, Westbury-on-Severn and Wotton-under-Edge and a very small parts of Herefordshire, Monmouthshire, Oxfordshire, Warwickshire, Wiltshire and Worcestershire.  The main series has a hiatus after GL20, resuming at GL50 for Cheltenham and areas immediately around and to its east, ceasing with GL56.

GL16 extends across the Welsh border and GL17 has the most alternative post towns in England: covering an upper part of the Forest of Dean studded with isolated large villages, five are recognised as post towns within one postcode district.



Coverage
The approximate coverage of the postcode districts:

! GL1
| GLOUCESTER
| The Docks, Central Gloucester
| Gloucester
|-
! GL2
| GLOUCESTER
| Arlingham, Cambridge, Churcham, Churchdown, Down Hatherley, Elmore, Framilode, Frampton on Severn, Hardwicke, Hempsted, Highnam, Kingsway, Longford, Longlevens, Longney, Maisemore, Minsterworth, Moreton Valence, Norton, Over, Podsmead, Priors Norton, Quedgeley, Rudford, Sandhurst, Saul, Slimbridge, Tibberton, Twigworth, Walham, Waterwells Business Park, Whitminster
| Forest of Dean, Gloucester, Stroud, Tewkesbury
|-
! GL3
| GLOUCESTER
| Barnwood, Brockworth, Churchdown, Coopers Hill, Gloucester Business Park, Great Witcombe, Hucclecote, Innsworth, Little Witcombe, Witcombe
| Gloucester, Stroud, Tewkesbury
|-
! GL4
| GLOUCESTER
| Abbeydale, Abbeymead, Barnwood, Birdlip, Brimpsfield, Brookthorpe, Cranham, Harescombe, Matson, Tuffley, Upton St Leonards, Whaddon
| Cotswold, Gloucester, Stroud
|-
! GL5
| STROUD
| Amberley, Bourne, Bowbridge, Brimscombe, Burleigh, Butterrow Hill, Cainscross, Cashes Green, Dudbridge, Dunkirk Mills, Ebley, Gaineys Well, Inchbrook, Kingscourt, Lightpill, Little London, Middle Leazes, North Woodchester, Paganhill, Randwick, Rodborough, Rodborough Common, Rodborough, Selsley, Selsley East, Selsley Hill, Selsley West, South Woodchester, Thrupp, Uplands, Wallbridge, Walls Quarry, Woodchester
| Stroud
|-
! GL6
| STROUD
| Aston Down, Bell Pitch, Bird in Hand, Bisley, Bournes Green, Box, Brownshill, Bussage, Chalford, Chalford Hill, Eastcombe, Edge, Edgeworth, Elcombe, Far Oakridge, Far Westrip, Forest Green, Frampton Mansell, France Lynch, Horsley, Lower Kitesnest, Lypiatt, Middle Lypiatt, Middle Spring, Minchinhampton, Miserden, Nailsworth, Oakridge, Oakridge Lynch, Old Neighbouring, Painswick, Painswick Beacon, Pitchcombe, Randwick, Ruscombe, Sheepscombe, Slad, Stancombe, The Camp, Upper Kitesnest, Westrip, Whiteshill, Whiteway
| Cotswold, Stroud
|-
! rowspan="3"| GL7
| CIRENCESTER
| Ampney Crucis, Ampney Knowle, Ampney St Mary, Ampney St Peter, Bagendon, Barnsley, Baunton, Bibury, Calmsden, Cerney Wick, Coates, Coln St. Aldwyns, Daglingworth, Bisley-with-Lypiatt, Down Ampney, Driffield, Duntisbourne Abbotts, Duntisbourne Leer, Duntisbourne Rouse, Eastleach, Ewen, Harnhill, Hatherop, Honeycombe Leaze, Kemble, Kemble Wick, Love Lane Industrial Estate, Lower Norcote, Marsden, Meysey Hampton, Middle Duntisbourne, Norcote, North Cerney, North Cerney Downs, Perrotts Brook, Poole Keynes, Poulton, Preston, Quenington, Rapsgate, Ready Token, Rendcomb, Rodmarton, Sapperton, Shorncote, Siddington, Somerford Keynes, South Cerney, Stratton, Tarlton, Tunley, Upper Up, Whiteway, Winson, Winstone, Woodmancote
| Cotswold, Stroud, Wiltshire
|-
| FAIRFORD
| Dudgrove, Dunfield, Kempsford, Totterdown, Whelford
| Cotswold
|-
| LECHLADE
| Broadwell, Claydon, Claydon Pike, Downington, Filkins, Fyfield, Kelmscott, Kencot, Langford, Little Faringdon, Little London, Southrop, Thornhill, Warrens Cross
| Cotswold, Vale of White Horse, West Oxfordshire
|-
! GL8
| TETBURY
| Ashley, Avening, Babdown, Bagpath, Beverston, Calcot, Chavenage, Cherington, Culkerton, Doughton, Estcourt, Ilsom, Kingscote, Knockdown, Lasborough, Leighterton, Little Larkhill, Long Furlong, Long Newnton, Newington, Shipton Moyne, Trull, Tetbury Upton, Upton, Westonbirt, Willesley
| Cotswold, Stroud, Wiltshire
|-
! GL9
| BADMINTON
| Acton Turville, Didmarton, Dunkirk, Hawkesbury, Hawkesbury Common, Hawkesbury Upton, Inglestone Common, Little Badminton, Petty France, Tormarton
| Cotswold, South Gloucestershire, Stroud, Wiltshire
|-
! GL10
| STONEHOUSE
| Bridgend, Colethrop, Eastington, Frocester, Haresfield, Kings Stanley, Leonard Stanley, Lower Mills, Nastend, Newtown, Nupend, Nympsfield, Oldends, Oxlynch, Ryeford, Standish, Standish Park, Stanley Downton, Stroudwater Business Park, Westend
| Stroud
|-
! GL11
| DURSLEY
| Ashmead Green, Bull Pitch, Cam, Coaley, Norman Hill, North Nibley, Owlpen, Sandpits, Stancombe, Stinchcombe, Tilsdown, Uley, Upper Wick, Wick, Woodfield, Woodmancote
| Stroud
|-
! style="background:#FFFFFF;"|GL11
| style="background:#FFFFFF;"|WOTTON-UNDER-EDGE
| style="background:#FFFFFF;"|
| style="background:#FFFFFF;"|non-geographic
|-
! GL12
| WOTTON-UNDER-EDGE
| Alderley, Bagstone, Bibstone, Bournstream, Bowcott, Bradley Green, Buckover, Charfield, Coombe, Cromhall, Cutts Heath, Damery, Falfield, Hall End, Heathend, Hillesley, Howley, Huntingford, Kingswood, Leyhill, Michaelwood, Milbury Heath, Old Town, Ozleworth, Southend, Swinhay, Synwell, Tabernacle Pitch, Tortworth, Tresham, Tytherington, Whitfield, Wickwar, Woodend, Wortley
| Cotswold, South Gloucestershire, Stroud
|-
! GL13
| BERKELEY
| Abwell, Alkington, Berkeley Heath, Berrycroft, Bevington, Blackhall, Breadstone, Clapton, Hainses, Halmore, Ham, Ham Green, Hamfields, Hill, Hinton, Hystfield, Lower Stone, Mobley New Brookend, Newport, Newtown, Old Brookend, Pitbrook, Purton, Rockhampton, Sharpness, Stone, Wanswell, Woodford
| South Gloucestershire, Stroud
|-
! rowspan="3"| GL14
| CINDERFORD
| Buckshaft, Denecroft, Forest Vale Industrial Estate, Hawkwell Green, Littledean, Lower Soudley, Ruspidge, Soudley, Trafalgar, Upper Soudley, Whimsey
| rowspan="3"|Forest of Dean
|-
| NEWNHAM
| Awre, Blaize Bailey, Broadoak, Bullo Pill, Elton, Flaxley, Pope's Hill, Ruddle
|-
| WESTBURY-ON-SEVERN
| Adsett, Bollow, Chaxhill, Grange Court, Ley, Northwood Green, Rodley, Walmore Common, Wintles Hill
|-
! rowspan="2"| GL15
| LYDNEY
| Allastone, Alvington, Aylburton, Bream, Hewelsfield, Lower Meend, Lower Yorkley, Netherend, Oldcroft, Parkend, Pillowell, St. Briavels, Viney Hill, Viney Woodside, Whitecroft, Woolaston, Yorkley, Yorkley Slade
| rowspan="2"|Forest of Dean
|-
| BLAKENEY
| Blakeney Hill, Bradley Hill, Etloe, Upper Etloe
|-
! GL16
| COLEFORD
| Bakers Hill, Berry Hill, Broadwell, Cannop, Christchurch, Clearwell, Coalway, Edge End, Ellwood, English Bicknor, Five Acres, Gorsty Knoll, Hillersland, Joyford, Joyford Hill, Little Drybrook, Lower Berry Hill, Lower Milkwall, Mile End, Milkwall, Mushet Industrial Park, Newland, Ready Penny, Shortstanding, Sling, Speech House, Staunton, Symonds Yat Rock, Tufthorn
| Forest of Dean, Monmouthshire
|-
! rowspan="5"| GL17
| LYDBROOK
| Central Lydbrook, Joys Green, Lower Lydbrook, Upper Lydbrook, Worrall Hill
| rowspan="5"|Forest of Dean, Herefordshire
|-
| RUARDEAN
| Ruardean Woodside, The Pludds
|-
| DRYBROOK
| Brierley, Harrow Hill, Ruardean Hill
|-
| MITCHELDEAN
| Lower Shapridge, Plump Hill, Wigpool
|-
| LONGHOPE
| Blaisdon, Little London, May Hill
|-
! rowspan="2"| GL18
| NEWENT
| Castle Tump, Cliffords Mesne, Four Oaks, Great Boulsdon, Highleadon, Hillend Green, Kilcot, Lower Boulsdon, Malswick, Oxenhall, Pool Hill, Upleadon
| rowspan="2"|Forest of Dean, Herefordshire
|-
| DYMOCK
| Broomsgreen, Greenway, Hallwood Green, Kempley, Ketford, Knights Green, Leddington, Ryton, Tillers Green
|-
! GL19
| GLOUCESTER
| Apperley, Ashleworth, Birdwood, Chaceley, Coombe Hill, Corse, Corse Lawn, Deerhurst, Deerhurst Walton, Eldersfield, Forthampton, Hartpury, Hasfield, Huntley, Lower Apperley, Pendock, Redmarley, Staunton, Taynton, The Leigh, Tibberton, Tirley, Walton Hill
| Forest of Dean, Gloucester, Malvern Hills, Tewkesbury
|-
! GL20
| TEWKESBURY
| Alderton, Alstone, Alstone Fields, Ashchurch, Aston Cross, Aston-on-Carrant, Back of Avon, Beckford, Bredon, Bredons Hardwick, Bredons Norton, Bushley, Claydon, Conderton, Fiddington, Grafton, Great Washbourne, Homedowns, Kemerton, Kinsham, Little Washbourne, Longdon, Natton Northway, Overbury, Pamington, Ripple, Shuthonger, Teddington, Tewkesbury Business Park, Tredington, Twyning, Uckinghall, Walton Cardiff, Westmancote
| Malvern Hills, Tewkesbury, Wychavon
|-
! GL50
| CHELTENHAM
| Prestbury
| Cheltenham, Tewkesbury
|-
! GL51
| CHELTENHAM
| Badgeworth, Bamfurlong, Bentham, Boddington, Cheltenham Trade Park, Elmstone Hardwicke, Gloucestershire Airport, Hayden, Kingsditch Trading Estate, Knightsbridge, Leckhampton, Little Shurdington, Shurdington, St. Marks, Staverton, Staverton Technology Park, Swindon Village, The Reddings, Uckington, Up Hatherley
| Cheltenham, Tewkesbury
|-
! GL52
| CHELTENHAM
| Battledown, Bishops Cleeve, Charlton Kings, Cleeve Hill, Gotherington, Oxenton, Prestbury, Southam, Stoke Orchard, Woodmancote, Woodmancote Park
| Cheltenham, Tewkesbury
|-
! GL53
| CHELTENHAM
| Caudle Green, Charlton Kings, Coberley, Coberley Village, Colesbourne, Cowley, Elkstone, Leckhampton, Leckhampton Hill, Seven Springs, Syde, Ullenwood, Upper Coberley
| Cheltenham, Cotswold, Tewkesbury
|-
! GL54
| CHELTENHAM
| Aldsworth, Andoversford, Bourton-on-the-Water, Brockhampton, Calcot, Charlton Abbotts, Charlton Kings, Chedworth, Clapton, Cold Aston, Coln Rogers, Coln St. Dennis, Compton Abdale, Condicote, Cutsdean, Didbrook, Eastington, Farmington, Fossebridge, Great Rissington, Greet, Gretton, Guiting Power, Hailes, Hampnett, Hawling, Hazleton, Icomb, Little Rissington, Lower Chedworth, Lower Coscombe, Lower Dowdeswell, Lower Slaughter, Lower Swell, Maugersbury, Middle Chedworth, Naunton, Northleach, Notgrove, Old Hinchwick, Salperton, Sevenhampton, Sherborne, Shipton Oliffe, Stanley Pontlarge, Stanway, Stow on the Wold, Temple Guiting, Toddington, Turkdean, Upper Dowdeswell, Upper Rissington, Upper Slaughter, Upper Swell, Whittington, Winchcombe, Withington, Wood Stanway, Wyck Rissington, Yanworth
| Cheltenham, Cotswold, Tewkesbury
|-
! GL55
| CHIPPING CAMPDEN
| Aston Sub Edge, Broad Campden, Burnt Norton, Charingworth, Ebrington, Hidcote Bartrim, Hidcote Boyce, Mickleton, Paxford, Weston-Sub Edge
| Cotswold, Stratford-on-Avon
|-
! GL56
| MORETON-IN-MARSH
| Adlestrop, Aston Magna, Barton-on-the-Heath, Batsford, Blockley, Bourton on the Hill, Broadwell, Chastleton, Daylesford, Donnington, Dorn, Draycott, Evenlode, Little Compton, Longborough, Lower Lemington, Oddington, Old Town, Sezincote, Snowshill Hill, Springhill Stretton on Fosse, Todenham, Upper Oddington
| Cotswold, Stratford-on-Avon, Tewkesbury, West Oxfordshire
|}

Map

See also
Postcode Address File
List of postcode areas in the United Kingdom

References

External links
Royal Mail's Postcode Address File
A quick introduction to Royal Mail's Postcode Address File (PAF)
Using Welsh alternative addresses within Royal Mail's Postcode Address File (PAF)

Gloucester
Postcode areas covering South West England
Postcode areas covering Wales